Lembophyllaceae is a family of pleurocarpous mosses in the order Hypnales. It was originally described by Finnish botanist Viktor Ferdinand Brotherus (1849–1929) in 1909. The family is mainly found in Australasia and southern South America.

Taxonomy
Lembophyllaceae is closely related to the family Neckeraceae. Members of Lembophyllaceae are differentiated from Neckeraceae by their typically terete shoots (vs. mostly complanate), the leaves being mostly often loosely appressed, and frequently well-developed peristomes (vs. reduced or 'neckeroid' periostomes).
Genera include:
 Antitrichia Bridel-Brederi - western North America
 Bestia Broth. – western North America
 Camptochaete Reichardt – Australasia
 Dolichomitra (Lindberg) Broth. – Southeast Asia
 Dolichomitriopsis S.Okamura – Southeast Asia
 Fallaciella H. A. Crum – Australasia, southern South America
 Fifea H. A. Crum – Australasia
 Isothecium Brid. – widespread in the northern hemisphere (e.g. Isothecium myosuroides)
 Lembophyllum Lindb. – Australasia, southern South America
 Looseria (Thér.) D. Quandt, S.Huttunen, Tangney, & Stech – southern South America
 Neobarbella Nog. – Southeast Asia
 Pilotrichella (Müll. Hal.) Besch. – Hawaii, tropical Americas, Africa, Madagascar
 Rigodium Kunze ex Schwägr. – Central and South America, East Africa, Madagascar
 Tripterocladium (Müll. Hal.) A. Jaeger – western North America
 Weymouthia Broth. – Australasia, southern South America

References

 
Moss families
Plants described in 1909